CHC Airways is an airline based in Hoofddorp, Netherlands. It operates a fleet of six aircraft and helicopters on behalf of leading airlines and international oil companies. Its main bases are Amsterdam Airport Schiphol and Den Helder Airport, with hubs at Brussels Airport and Rotterdam The Hague Airport.

History

The airline was established in 1945 as Schreiner Airways. It was part of the Schreiner Aviation Group which was purchased by the CHC Helicopter Corporation in 2005 and Schreiner Airways became CHC Airways.

In 2016, CHC ceased flight operations.

Fleet

The CHC Airways fleet includes the following aircraft (at June 2018):

References

External links

CHC Helicopter Corporation

Airlines of the Netherlands
Helicopter airlines
Airlines established in 2005
Dutch companies established in 2005
Companies based in North Holland